JoMoX Elektronische Musikinstrumente GmbH is a German electronic musical instrument manufacturer founded in 1997 and based in Berlin. Jürgen Michaelis is the CEO and product developer.  The company specializes in analog synthesizers.  The XBase 09 was the first product offered from JoMoX, and it continues to be the most requested device from the product line.

Products

Current products

 Alpha Base - analog drum synthesizer and drum machine, with analog instruments (Kick drum, MBrane), sample capabilities, 6 hybrid samples channels (that are processed through analog VCA and VCF), 2 channels of pure digital samples + 1 FM synth. LFOs, reverb and delay
 M.Brane11 - analog percussion synthesizer
 MBase 11 - kick drum synthesizer, sequel to MBase01
 T-Resonator - versatile filter with digital stereo delay integrated into the feedback loops
 MBase01 - kick drum analog synthesizer
 Resonator Neuronium - experimental analog neural network synthesizer
 M-Resonator - filter based on the Resonator Neuronium idea

Discontinued products
 XBASE 888 - analog drum synthesizer and drum machine identical to XBASE 999 less the X-Filter
 SunSyn Mk2 - 8-voice true analog synthesizer
 Midi-to-CV Interfaces - old MIDI interfaces 1994-1996
 MoonWind - Analogue stereo filter tracker
 SunSyn - 8 voice polyphonic multitimbral true analog synthesizer. JoMoX's first major analog synthesizer.
 XBASE 999 - analog drum synthesizer and drum machine with downloadable percussion samples and assignable analog stereo multimode filter with LFOs
 AiRBase99 - a 1U drum module based on the XBase09 with additional features
 JaZBase03 - alternative to AirBase99
 XBase09 - emulator of TR-909 with its sequencer qualities plus additional features

See also
 Roland TR-808
 Roland TR-909
Note: XBASE 888 and XBASE 999 are considered clones of the TR-808 and TR-909

References

External links
 Official website
 Xbase09 Information and Mp3 demo

Synthesizer manufacturing companies of Germany
Musical instrument manufacturing companies based in Berlin